THS may stand for:

Organizations
 Student Union at the Royal Institute of Technology (Tekniska Högskolans Studentkår), Stockholm
 Theatre Historical Society of America, a non-profit group celebrating historic movie palaces in the United States

Transportation
 Sukhothai Airport (IATA code), Sukhothai, Thailand
 Tai Hing (South) stop (MTR station code), Hong Kong
 Toyota Hybrid System, set of hybrid car technologies developed by Toyota
 Thurso railway station (National Rail code) in Thurso, Scotland

Other
 Thyroid-stimulating hormone, a pituitary hormone
 Transhuman Space, a variant of the normal GURPS roleplaying game.